This is a timeline of the history of planetariums.

Historic influences

Development of modern planetariums

Digital and Fulldome video

References

Planetariums
Planetariums